Tinun (also Romanized as Tīnūn; also known as Tīnūs and Tītūn) is a village in Derakhtengan Rural District, in the Central District of Kerman County, Kerman Province, Iran. At the 2006 census, its population was 40, in 10 families.

References 

Populated places in Kerman County